Edward Rogers Bushnell (December 5, 1876 - January 5, 1951) was an American track and field athlete who competed at the 1900 Summer Olympics in Paris, France. He was born in Republican City, Nebraska and died in Moorestown, New Jersey.

Bushnell competed in the 800 metres.  He placed somewhere between fourth and sixth in his first-round (semifinals) heat and did not advance to the final.

References

External links

 De Wael, Herman. Herman's Full Olympians: "Athletics 1900". Accessed 18 March 2006.
 

1876 births
1951 deaths
Athletes (track and field) at the 1900 Summer Olympics
Olympic track and field athletes of the United States
American male middle-distance runners
Burials at West Laurel Hill Cemetery
People from Harlan County, Nebraska
Sportspeople from Nebraska
Penn Quakers men's track and field athletes